Gaynor Arnold (born 1944) is a Welsh-born author. Born in Cardiff, she studied English Literature at St. Hilda's College, Oxford, and obtained a Diploma in Social and Administrative Studies from the Department of Social Policy and Intervention, University of Oxford.

Background
Since the early 1970s, Arnold has lived in Edgbaston in Birmingham, working as a social worker for Birmingham City Council. She became a full-time writer in 2009.

Recognitions
Her debut novel Girl in a Blue Dress was published by Birmingham's Tindal Street Press in 2008, being longlisted for both the Booker Prize and the Orange Prize for Fiction.

Bibliography
 Girl in a Blue Dress (2008)
 Lying Together (2011)
 After Such Kindness (2012)
 The Sea in Birmingham (2013) contributor

References

1944 births
Living people
Writers from Cardiff
Welsh novelists
21st-century Welsh novelists
Alumni of St Hilda's College, Oxford